Eriogonum covilleanum is a species of wild buckwheat known by the common name Coville's buckwheat. It is endemic to California, where it grows in the Coast Ranges from the Bay Area to the hills north of the Los Angeles area. It is uncommon in general but it can be locally common in some places. This is an annual herb producing an erect, reddish-tinted green flowering stem up to about 40 centimeters high. The leaves are under 2 centimeters long, rounded to oblong in shape, and woolly in texture, especially on the undersides. The many scattered inflorescences are small, compact clusters of tiny flowers in shades of yellow or pinkish to white.

External links
Jepson Manual Treatment
Photo gallery

covilleanum
Flora of California
Flora without expected TNC conservation status